Stilbocarpa is a genus of flowering plant most often placed in the family Araliaceae; it might be closer to the Apiaceae however. It comprises 3 species, two of which are endemic to New Zealand, while one is also found on Australia's subantarctic Macquarie Island.

Temporary flutes are spoken of as being made from the hollow stalks of "bunui" (S. lyallii, S. polaris) by Māori children in Aotearoa New Zealand during Historical times, while taking a break from the hard work of muttonbirding. Richard Nunns with Allan Thomas quote George Te Au of Murihiku saying "They lasted for a while, then they collapsed."

References

Araliaceae
Flora of New Zealand
Apiales genera